The 2005 West Asian Games was the third West Asian Games, an international tournament for West Asian countries and territories. It was hosted by Doha, Qatar. Iraq were the champions when they beat Syria on penalties.

Results

Group stage

Group A

Group B

Group C

Knockout stage

Semi-finals 
Iraq, Iran and Syria qualified as Groups winner, a toss between Qatar and Saudi Arabia decided on the 'best' runners-up also qualifying for the semifinals; Saudi Arabia won.

Bronze medal match

Gold medal match

References

External links 
 Rsssf.com

West
2005
International association football competitions in Asia
2005 West Asian Games
2005 West Asian Games
2005–06 in Qatari football
2005–06 in Iranian football
2005–06 in Iraqi football
2005–06 in Syrian football
2005–06 in Saudi Arabian football
2005–06 in Bahraini football
2005–06 in Kuwaiti football
2005–06 in Omani football